was a 4,282-ton Japanese combined cargo vessel/passenger ship built in 1927 by Uraga Dock Company for Osaka Shosen Kaisha.
She was originally conceived as a high speed transport for perishable fruits, especially bananas, and had an advanced mechanical ventilation system to cool her cargo hold. She could also accommodate six first-class and 64 third-class passengers.

Fate
During the opening days of World War II, while assisting Japanese troops in the Japanese invasion of Vigan in northern Luzon, Philippines on 10 December 1941, she was attacked by Curtiss P-40 Warhawks, Boeing B-17 Flying Fortresses, and Seversky P-35 fighters of the U.S. Far East Air Force and was beached to prevent sinking. The beached ship was later attacked by Filipino guerrillas and was rendered a complete loss.

References 

1927 ships
Ships built by Uraga Dock Company
Steamships of Japan
Shipwrecks of the Philippines
Maritime incidents in December 1941
Ships of the OSK Line